
Year 496 (CDXCVI) was a leap year starting on Monday (link will display the full calendar) of the Julian calendar. In the Roman Empire, it was known as the Year of the Consulship of Paulus without colleague (or, less frequently, year 1249 Ab urbe condita). The denomination 496 for this year has been used since the early medieval period, when the Anno Domini calendar era became the prevalent method in Europe for naming years.

Events 
 By place 
 Byzantine Empire 
 Emperor Anastasius I has Euphemius, patriarch of Constantinople, deposed and excommunicated. He appoints Macedonius II as his successor. Euphemius is sent into exile. 

 Europe 
 Battle of Tolbiac: King Clovis I defeats the Alamanni at Zülpich (Germany). Gibuld, last king of the Alamanni, is killed in battle and the territory is incorporated into the Frankish Kingdom.
 December 25 – Clovis I is baptized into the Catholic faith at Rheims, by Saint Remigius. The conversion strengthens the bonds between his Gallo-Roman subjects, led by their Catholic bishops.

 Africa 
 Thrasamund succeeds his brother Gunthamund after his death, and becomes king of the Vandals. Under his rule, he ends the persecution of the Catholics.

 Asia 
 King Kavadh I of Persia is deposed and exiled to Susiana by his younger brother Djamasp. He is installed by the nobles to the Sassanid throne.
 Emperor Xiao Wen Di of Northern Wei starts the Sinicization process, by changing his clan name to the Han Chinese surname Yuan.

 By topic 
 Religion 
 November 21 – Gelasius I dies after a 4-year reign, and is succeeded by the Rome-born Anastasius II as the 50th pope.

Births 
 Childebert I, king of the Franks (d. 558)
 Erzhu Tianguang, general of Northern Wei (d. 532)
 Gao Huan, general of Northern Wei (d. 547)
 Germain, bishop of Paris (d. 576)

Deaths 
 November 19 – Pope Gelasius I
 Athanasius, Coptic Orthodox patriarch of Alexandria
 Epiphanius, bishop of Pavia (b. 438)
 Gennadius of Massilia, priest and historian
 Gibuld, king of the Alamanni
 Gunthamund, king of the Vandals and Alans

References